Mark James DeSaulnier (born March 31, 1952) is an American politician who has served as the U.S. representative for California's 10th congressional district since 2015 (known as the 11th congressional district until 2023). The district includes most of Contra Costa County, a suburban county in the East Bay. He has been a member of the Democratic Party since 2000; before that, he was a Republican.

Before serving in the House of Representatives, DeSaulnier was a member the Concord City Council (1991–94), a Contra Costa County Supervisor (1994–2006), and a member of the California State Legislature, representing the 11th State Assembly district from 2006 to 2008 and the 7th State Senate district from 2008 to 2015.

Early life and education
DeSaulnier was born in Lowell, Massachusetts, to Edward Joseph DeSaulnier Jr. and Virginia Ann DeSaulnier (née Burke). He was raised in a Roman Catholic family. He earned a Bachelor of Arts in history from the College of the Holy Cross.

After his father, a Massachusetts Superior Court judge, became involved in a scandal in the early 1970s, DeSaulnier relocated to California, settling in Concord. He worked as a probation officer, truck driver, and hotel services employee. He later owned and operated several restaurants in the San Francisco Bay Area.

Early political career

Concord politics 
DeSaulnier was appointed to the Concord Planning Commission in 1988. In 1991, he was elected to the Concord City Council and served as mayor of Concord in 1993. He was also a member of the University of California Toxic Substances Research and Teaching Program Advisory Committee.

Contra Costa County Board of Supervisors 
In early 1994, Governor Pete Wilson appointed DeSaulnier, then a fellow Republican, to the Contra Costa County Board of Supervisors, filling a vacancy caused by the resignation of Supervisor Sunne McPeak. He was elected in 1994 and reelected in 1998 and 2002. In 1998, he received 98.4% of the vote against write-in candidates. In 2002, he received 79% of the vote against challenger Dione Mustard.

During DeSaulnier's tenure on the Board of Supervisors, he sponsored the Industrial Safety Ordinance and the Refinery Flare Rule for local refineries and chemical facilities. He served on the executive boards of the Association of Bay Area Governments, the Bay Area Air Quality Management District and the Metropolitan Transportation Commission. He was appointed to represent the Bay Area on the California Air Resources Board by the Air District (1997–2006).

As a member of the Air Resources Board, DeSaulnier supported strong environmental regulations, including cleaner-burning gasoline, lower-emission vehicles (LEVs), the identification of diesel exhaust as a toxic air contaminant, dioxin monitoring in the Bay Area, the banning of methyl tertiary-butyl ether (MTBE) in gasoline, the identification of secondhand smoke as a carcinogen, the reduction of emissions from dairy farms, the phase-out of rice straw in the central valley, and the reduction of emissions from cruise ships.

On a county level, DeSaulnier introduced a Women's Health Program to serve the health-care needs of Contra Costa County. He also established the annual Children and Families' Budget, a separate county budget that reviews and measures the effectiveness of county programs in these areas. His other projects for children include AfterSchool4All, the Future Fund and the Children and Families Committee of the Board of Supervisors.

California State Assembly

In the June 2006 Democratic primary, DeSaulnier won 52% of the vote against Pittsburg School Board Trustee Laura Canciamilla and two other opponents. He was endorsed by the San Francisco Chronicle, the Contra Costa Times, U.S. Senator Barbara Boxer and California Senator Tom Torlakson. DeSaulnier won the general election against Republican Arne Simonsen and Libertarian Cory Nott with 66% of the vote.

In the Assembly, DeSaulnier chaired the Committee on Transportation and the Select Committees on Growth Management and Air Quality. He was also a member of the Assembly Committees on Appropriations, Human Services, Rules and Labor and Employment. He authored or co-authored over 40 bills during the 200708 legislative session. His bills addressed truancy among schoolchildren, preschool access, suicide prevention, childhood obesity, reducing air pollution, smoke-free workplaces, and opportunities for at-risk youth.

One bill DeSaulnier introduced, AB 1617, would have restricted tobacco smokers from purchasing tobacco products online. Governor Arnold Schwarzenegger vetoed the bill. Another DeSaulnier bill, AB 2235, would have required that a biometric feature be incorporated into all new handguns sold in California.

For the Live Earth concert in July 2007, DeSaulnier delivered the Democratic weekly radio address on steps people can take to reduce their carbon footprint.

California State Senate
DeSaulnier was elected to the California State Senate in 2008, representing the 7th Senate district, which includes most of Contra Costa County. He received early support from the Contra Costa Central Labor Council, the Contra Costa Building Trades Council and the California League of Conservation Voters. He received 98% of the vote in the June Democratic primary election against write-in candidates; former Assemblyman Joe Canciamilla initially was to challenge DeSaulnier, but dropped out of the race. In the general election, DeSaulnier received 66.6% of the vote against Republican Christian Amsberry.

In the Senate, DeSaulnier chaired the Labor and Industrial Relations committee and was a member of the Health, Transportation and Housing, and Appropriations committees. He also chaired the select committees on Constitutional Reform and Growth Management.

DeSaulnier authored over 20 bills addressing workers' ability to designate their treating physician before an injury, providing for greater prescription drug safety, supporting increased funding for alcohol-abuse programs, and expanding electronic recycling and funding for climate protection. He supported Senate Concurrent Resolution (SCR) 3 to propose to California voters the question whether to call a convention to reform the state constitution.

In September 2009, DeSaulnier amended SB 88 to attempt to restrict local governments' ability to shed pension programs through bankruptcy protection.

In 2012, DeSaulnier proposed a bill, SB1366, that would require gun owners whose guns are stolen or lost to report the fact to police within 48 hours. Failure to comply would result in fines on the first and second offenses, with higher fines and possible jail on the third. The bill was endorsed by the Brady Campaign to Prevent Gun Violence and the California Police Chiefs Association and opposed by the California Rifle and Pistol Association.

In 2014, DeSaulnier was elected to represent California's 11th congressional district in the United States House of Representatives. He resigned his state senate seat in order to join Congress.

U.S. House of Representatives

Elections

2009
In 2009, DeSaulnier announced his candidacy for the United States House of Representatives in the special election in California's 10th congressional district after the resignation of Ellen Tauscher, who endorsed him. In the September 1 Democratic primary, DeSaulnier came in second, behind John Garamendi.

2014
In 2014, after George Miller announced his retirement from the U.S. House of Representatives, DeSaulnier announced his candidacy for California's 11th congressional district to succeed him. He won the general election and took office on January 3, 2015.

2022
In December 2021, California's congressional district boundaries were redrawn as part of statewide redistricting. DeSaulnier announced that he would seek reelection in the 10th congressional district, and is one of three candidates in the June 7, 2022 primary election.

Tenure
DeSaulnier and Representative David Cicilline introduced legislation to create a pathway for local newspapers to operate as nonprofits. They attributed the loss of local ad revenue to the shift in media consumption habits: "As consumers have turned to online platforms like Facebook and Google to read the news, advertisers have followed, taking away a vital source of revenue local publications need to maintain their staffing levels. Local news organizations do not get a cut of the financial benefit when their stories are shared online". The bill grants local news companies a 48-month safe harbor from anti-trust laws to negotiate with prominent online platforms for ad profits to address the shortage of journalists.

In May 2019, DeSaulnier introduced the Bots Research Act (H.R. 2860), a bill to establish a task force of experts at the Federal Trade Commission to determine the impact of bots on social media, public discourse, and elections.

As of October 2021, DeSaulnier had voted in line with Joe Biden's stated position 100% of the time.

Committee assignments 

 Committee on Education and Labor
 Subcommittee on Early Childhood, Elementary and Secondary Education
 Subcommittee on Health, Employment, Labor, and Pensions
 Committee on Oversight and Government Reform
 Subcommittee on Economic and Consumer Policy
 Subcommittee on National Security
 Committee on Transportation and Infrastructure
 Subcommittee on Highways and Transit
 Subcommittee on Aviation
 Committee on Rules

Caucuses

 Congressional Innovation and the Human Condition Caucus (Chair)
 Congressional Friends of Jesuit Colleges and Universities Caucus (Co-Chair)
 Congressional Cancer Survivors Caucus (Co-Chair)
 Congressional Caucus on Urban Regional Studies (Co-Chair)
 American Sikh Congressional Caucus
 Innovation and the Human Condition Caucus
 Congressional Progressive Caucus
 Gun Violence Prevention Task Force
 Out of Poverty Caucus
 Humanities Caucus
 Animal Protection Caucus
 Safe Climate Caucus
Medicare for All Caucus

Political positions

Abortion
DeSaulnier has a F rating from the anti-abortion Susan B. Anthony List for his abortion-related voting record. He opposed the overturning of Roe v. Wade, calling it "an assault on the freedom of all women and an attack on equality."

Syria
In 2023, DeSaulnier was among 56 Democrats to vote in favor of H.Con.Res. 21 which directed President Joe Biden to remove U.S. troops from Syria within 180 days.

Electoral history

Personal life
A member of the Concord Chamber of Commerce and the Contra Costa Council, DeSaulnier lives in Concord, California, where he raised his two sons. He is an avid runner and has completed 23 marathons.

In May 2016, DeSaulnier announced that he had been diagnosed with chronic lymphocytic leukemia in 2015 and had undergone chemotherapy. While the cancer was described as incurable, DeSaulnier said he would still seek reelection.

On March 13, 2020, DeSaulnier was hospitalized in Washington, D.C., for a rib fracture sustained during a run, as well as for pneumonia. On March 21, it was announced that his health had declined, and he was reported as being in critical condition. He steadily recovered, and was released from the hospital on May 4.

References

External links

 Congressman Mark DeSaulnier official U.S. House website
 Mark DeSaulnier for Congress campaign website
 
 

|-

1952 births
20th-century American politicians
21st-century American politicians
American restaurateurs
California city council members
California Republicans
California state senators
College of the Holy Cross alumni
County supervisors in California
Harvard Kennedy School staff
Living people
Mayors of places in California
Members of the California State Assembly
Members of the United States House of Representatives from California
People from Concord, California
Politicians from Lowell, Massachusetts
Democratic Party members of the United States House of Representatives from California